James Steven Chanos (born December 24, 1957) is an American investment manager. He is president and founder of Kynikos Associates, a New York City registered investment advisor focused on short selling. A noted art collector, he appeared on the BBC Four documentary The Banker's Guide to Art.

Early life and education
James Steven Chanos was born in 1957 into a Greek immigrant family living in Milwaukee, Wisconsin, that operated a chain of dry-cleaning shops. He graduated from Wylie E. Groves High School and received a B.A. in Economics and Political Science from Yale University in 1980.

Personal life 
Mr. Chanos lives in Florida. He is currently a lecturer in finance and a Becton Fellow at the Yale School of Management, where he teaches a class on the history of financial fraud. He serves as a trustee of the Nightingale-Bamford School and the New-York Historical Society and previously served as president of the board of The Browning School.

Career
Chanos began his career at brokerage firm Gilford Securities in 1982. While at Gilford, he performed a cash-flow analysis and made a sell recommendation that ultimately exposed Baldwin-United, which filed for bankruptcy in 1983. Shortly thereafter, Chanos was recruited to Deutsche Bank, where he analyzed Michael Milken's junk bonds and Drexel Burnham Lambert.

After working as an analyst in several firms, Chanos founded Kynikos (Greek for "cynic") in 1985 with $16 million, as a firm specializing in short selling. One critical position he took at Kynikos was the shorting of Enron.

He describes his investment strategy as "intensive research into stocks", looking for fundamental failures in market valuation, from underestimated or unreported failings in the business or the market of a particular stock, followed by a substantial short position which he is willing to hold for quite a long time — perhaps an opposite echo to Warren Buffett's reputed "fundamentals+long stay" investment strategy. Some have said his commitment serves as whistle-blowing more than do most speculations, as in his heavy shortselling of such companies as Baldwin-United and Enron Corporation.

Throughout the 2010s, Chanos and other short sellers faced a tough environment during a booming period for M&A and a record amount of share reacquisitions. A New York Times profile of several short sellers in 2015 described Chanos and others as "waiting in the wings" for the bull market to end. The same profile described Chanos's Kynikos Associates as losing more than half its value in the last five years from $6 billion to $2.5 billion, compelling Chanos to pitch "a new fund to investors that will take a portfolio of long positions and overlay the firm’s traditional short portfolio". 2020 was an especially terrible year for Chanos and other short sellers according to Institutional Investor, calling their firms "a shadow of their former selves." The magazine noted Kynikos ended 2020 with a mere $405 million in assets, compared to $2 billion in 2018.

Investments

Correct bet on Enron collapse
Chanos gained notability as a short seller when he predicted the fall of Enron before it filed for bankruptcy in 2001; he was a short seller of Enron throughout 2001, increasing his short position as more information surfaced. Kynikos profited from the trade.

Prediction on Chinese real estate crash
Chanos is a long-time skeptic of the Chinese economy. In September 2009 on CNBC Chanos said the Chinese miracle economy was "getting harder and harder to believe", predicting the country would head the way of the "old Soviet Union". In January 2010, the New York Times referenced Chanos making a prediction of an impending Chinese economic crash that would resemble "Dubai times 1,000 — or worse". Later on the Charlie Rose Show in April 2010 he maintained that China was on a "treadmill to hell" that would result in a crash caused by a "world class" property bubble.

The Chinese real estate crash predicted in 2009 and 2010 did not materialize and has caused financial media to question his investment wisdom. Bloomberg in a December 2017 article noted "Chanos has made wayward bets against U.S. stocks and China recently". The Financial Times in an October 2017 article used his "Dubai times 1,000" quote an example of one of the "dire prophecies" about China's real estate market that did not come true, demonstrating the subject was "tricky for foreign investors and experts to grasp". The Economist in a January 2021 article on the Chinese property boom observed housing prices doubled and "enough homes have been built for 250m people" since Chanos likened Chinese real estate to "Dubai on steroids". According to the Economist, the failure of the prediction of a crash suggested the market is "more complex than its depiction as a bubble." 

In a September 2021 New York Times article on the 2020–2022 Chinese property sector crisis, it was noted "...Jim Chanos, a prominent American investor, warned that China’s real-estate excesses had placed it on a 'treadmill to hell' and that the bubble might burst at any point. But the bubble did not burst in 2010. It did not burst in 2011, nor has it burst in the decade since — unless, that is, it’s starting to do so this week."

Later prediction on Chinese real estate crash
After speaking out about Chinese real estate in 2009 and 2010, the biggest bet made by Chanos was "against the Chinese economy" according to DealBook of the New York Times in 2014. Later in the 2010s Chanos reduced his bet. In an interview during a forum event hosted by Schechter Wealth in December 2017, he said "in the past few years...we've reduced our China short and our global fund to the lowest its been". Chanos stated renewed bearishness for Chinese real estate and the Chinese economy in a 2021 interview. Chanos again predicted an impending real estate crash in China. There would be "no historical analog" according to Chanos. "Maybe Tokyo in ’89? But this is worse than that. It’s worse than Spain in ’06 or Ireland in ’06."

Caterpillar
At the CNBC Institutional Investor Delivering Alpha Conference in 2013, Chanos revealed his firm was short on Caterpillar Inc. Chanos explained that Caterpillar had enjoyed a "once in a generation, if not once in a lifetime" boom in infrastructure investment because of China's buildout, which was coming to an end. In 2016, Chanos maintained on CNBC his firm was still betting against Caterpillar. Chanos stated the "collapse has not happened" because the Chinese debt and real estate bubble had not yet popped.

Luckin Coffee
Chanos took and closed a short position on Luckin Coffee Inc. in 2020 on the advice of fellow short-seller Carson Block of Muddy Waters Research. The stock dropped 70% in April 2020 after the company disclosed in a securities filing that its chief operating officer had fabricated about 2.2 billion yuan ($310 million) of reported 2019 sales. Chanos remarked on CNBC, “How many times do investors have to be burned in these companies that are just too good to be true? Growing 40% to 50% a year, with all kinds of odd transactions with affiliates.”

Wirecard AG
Chanos took and closed a short position on Wirecard AG. Wirecard AG stock dropped about 96% in June 2020 after the company's auditor EY disclosed that the company was missing about $2.1 billion. Wirecard announced that the $2.1 billion (€1.9 billion) likely doesn't exist. On Bloomberg Chanos said that he believes that "Wirecard was never profitable."

The Hertz Corporation
Chanos took and closed a short position on The Hertz Corporation. Chanos covered his short position prior to the Hertz bankruptcy. Chanos remarked about his closed short position on Hertz that he didn't believe it would survive the next recession.

Beyond Meat 
Chanos holds a short position against Beyond Meat. Chanos remarked on a Financial Times article, "Beyond Meat" still trades at 10 times revenues. This is a company that's still priced for perfection here. The market trades at 2.5 times revenue and successful consumer companies trade at 4 times revenue." Chanos remarked further, stating "Beyond Meat has ceased to be a growth company". The stock is down 54% since its IPO as of July 2022 as investor concerns regarding increasing pressure on Beyond Meat's margins as mentioned in the Financial Times article by Arun Sundaram, an analyst at CFRA.

References

External links
Chanos' statement to the SEC regarding hedge funds
Remarks by Chanos to US House (2002)
Chanos' Wall Street Journal article on the financial crisis and short selling

Charlie Rose Interview (flash video). April 12, 2010. About the China housing bubble

1957 births
American financial analysts
American investors
American money managers
American people of Greek descent
American hedge fund managers
American stock traders
Living people
Yale College alumni